Ashish Vidyarthi (born 19 June 1962) is an Indian actor who predominantly works in Hindi, Telugu, Tamil, Kannada, Malayalam, English, Odia, Marathi and Bengali films. He is noted for his antagonist and character roles. In 1995, he received the National Film Award for Best Supporting Actor for Drohkaal.

Early life
Ashish Vidyarthi was born on 19 June 1962 in Delhi, India to a Malayali father from Kannur in Kerala, and a Bengali mother from Rajasthan. His mother Reba Vidyarthi (Née: Chattopadhyay) was a Kathak guru, while his father Govind Vidyarthi is an expert in cataloging and archiving vanishing Performing Arts of India for the Sangeet Natak Akademi. He attended National School of Drama until 1990 and associated himself with another theatre group, Act One, run by N. K. Sharma.

Career 
In 1992, he moved to Bombay (now Mumbai). Ashish played the role of V. P. Menon in his first film, Sardar, based on Sardar Vallabhai Patel's Life. Though, his first release was Drohkaal, for which he won a National Film Award for Best Supporting Actor in 1995. He is also renowned for his role as Ashutosh, in 1942:A Love Story. Ashish received the Star Screen Award for Best Actor in a Negative Role, for the 1996 film Is Raat Ki Subah Nahin.

Vidhyarthi has worked in 11 languages in over 300 films. He is the co-founder & curator of AVID MINER Conversations, which are interactive modules customized for organizations.

Currently he has a YouTube channel with over one million subscriber and he often vlogs about food.

Filmography

Films

Television And OTT shows

Awards
Won
 1995: National Film Award for Best Supporting Actor: Drohkaal
 1996: Bengal Film Journalists' Association - Best Actor Award (Hindi): Is Raat Ki Subah Nahin
 1997: Star Screen Award for Best Villain: Is Raat Ki Subah Nahin
 2005: Filmfare Award for Best Villain – Telugu: Athanokkade
2012: Nandi Award for Best Character Actor: Minugurulu
Nominated
 1996: Filmfare Best Villain Award for Drohkaal
 1997: Filmfare Best Villain Award: Is Raat Ki Subah Nahin
 2012: SIIMA Award for Best Actor in a Negative Role (Telugu): Ala Modalaindi
 2014: SIIMA Award for Best Actor in a Negative Role (Kannada): Shivajinagara

References

External links
 
 
 
 Ashish Vidyarthi: Filmography at Bollywood Hungama

Indian male film actors
Tamil male actors
Male actors in Hindi cinema
Male actors in Kannada cinema
Indian male television actors
Telugu male actors
Living people
Bengal Film Journalists' Association Award winners
Best Supporting Actor National Film Award winners
Screen Awards winners
Filmfare Awards South winners
Bharatiya Vidya Bhavan schools alumni
Male actors from Kannur
Male actors in Malayalam cinema
20th-century Indian male actors
21st-century Indian male actors
Male actors in Bengali cinema
Male actors in Tamil cinema
1962 births
National School of Drama alumni